Marcos Antonio Menezes Godoi (born December 18, 1966) is a former Brazilian football player.

Club statistics

References

External links

1966 births
Living people
Brazilian footballers
Japan Soccer League players
J1 League players
Cerezo Osaka players
Gamba Osaka players
Brazilian expatriate footballers
Expatriate footballers in Japan
Association football midfielders